Volvanarius is a genus of fungi in the family Cortinariaceae.

Taxonomy 
The genus was created in 2022 when the family Cortinariaceae, which previously contained only the one genus of Cortinarius was reclassified based on genomic data and split into the genera of Cortinarius, Aureonarius, Austrocortinarius, Calonarius, Cystinarius, Hygronarius, Mystinarius, Phlegmacium, Thaxterogaster and Volvanarius.

The genus is further divided with subgenus classifications:

 Volvanarius subgenus Thaumasti.
 Volvanarius subgenus Volvanarius.

Etymology 
The name Volvanarius derives from the word volva and Cortinarius. This is in reference to the volva which many species in this genus present with.

Species 
As of January 2023, Species Fungorum accepted eight species of Volvanarius.
 Volvanarius chlorophanus (M.M. Moser) Niskanen & Liimat. (2022)
 Volvanarius chlorosplendidus (Furci, Niskanen, San-Fabian, Liimat. & Salgado Salomón) Niskanen & Liimat. (2022)
 Volvanarius coleopus (M.M. Moser & E. Horak) Niskanen & Liimat. (2022)
 Volvanarius cosmoxanthus (M.M. Moser) Niskanen & Liimat. (2022)
 Volvanarius olivaceovaginatus (Niskanen, San-Fabian, Liimat. & E. Horak) Niskanen & Liimat. (2022)
 Volvanarius subcosmoxanthus (Liimat., San-Fabian & Niskanen) Niskanen & Liimat. (2022)
 Volvanarius thaumastus (Soop) Niskanen & Liimat. (2022)
 Volvanarius vaginatus (E. Horak & M.M. Moser) Niskanen & Liimat. (2022)

References 

Agaricales genera
Cortinariaceae